Come Listen Awhile is a Canadian music television series which aired on CBC Television from 1963 to 1964.

Premise
Doug Campbell hosted this Vancouver-produced folk music series with regulars Bud Spencer (vocals), Pat Trudell (piano) and an orchestra led by George Colangis who welcomed various visiting artists.

Scheduling
This half-hour series was broadcast Tuesdays at 5:30 p.m. (Eastern) from 1 October 1963 to 23 June 1964.

References

External links
 

CBC Television original programming
1963 Canadian television series debuts
1964 Canadian television series endings
Television shows filmed in Vancouver